John Bruton Carden (May 19, 1921 – February 8, 1949) was a Major League Baseball pitcher who played in one game for the New York Giants on May 18, . He pitched in two innings, and allowed five earned runs. Carden died at age 27 after accidentally electrocuting himself.

External links

1921 births
1949 deaths
Accidental deaths by electrocution
Accidental deaths in Texas
Baseball players from Texas
Knoxville Smokies players
Major League Baseball pitchers
New York Giants (NL) players
Sportspeople from Killeen, Texas
Richmond Colts players
Sioux City Soos players
Texas A&M Aggies baseball players
Trenton Giants players